Santa Rosa Guachipilín is a city and municipality in the Santa Ana department of El Salvador situated close to the Lempa River.

References 

Municipalities of the Santa Ana Department